Drive North is the third studio album by the American rock band SWMRS, released on February 12, 2016, through their own label, Uncool Records. It was re-released by Fueled By Ramen on October 14, 2016 when they added the songs "Palm Trees" and "Lose It" to the record. It is the band's first studio album and second overall release under the name SWMRS after changing their name in late 2014. It is the first album to feature bassist Seb Mueller and guitarist Max Becker, who previously played bass. It is the band's first independent release and is also the band's first studio album not to be produced by drummer Joey Armstrong's father, Billie Joe Armstrong.

Background
The band started recording the album in mid-2015 with FIDLAR vocalist Zac Carper as the producer. The first track of the album's tracks, "Silver Bullet", was released on February 5, 2015. The song was originally slated to be part of the band's later-canceled EP "Silver Bullet/Palm Trees". Two of the album's tracks, "Miley" and "Uncool", were released on September 8, 2015. The band announced the album on November 7, 2015 and released the album's fourth single "Figuring it Out". The album's fifth single, "Drive North", was released on January 29, 2016. When the album was re-released through Fueled By Ramen, it included two new songs titled "Palm Trees" and "Lose It".

Track listing

Personnel
SWMRS
Cole Becker – lead vocals, rhythm guitar, piano, keyboards, synthesizers
Max Becker – lead vocals, lead guitar
Sebastian Mueller – bass guitar, backing vocals
Joey Armstrong – drums, percussion, backing vocals

Production
Zac Carper – production
Jeff Ellis – mixing
Igor Druda Imhof – engineer assistant

Charts

References

2016 albums
SWMRS albums
Fueled by Ramen albums